Qaleh Tork-e Sofla (also Romanized as Qal‘eh Tork-e Soflá) is a village in Harasam Rural District, Homeyl District, Eslamabad-e Gharb County, Kermanshah Province, Iran. At the 2006 census, its population was 133, in 29 families.

References 

Populated places in Eslamabad-e Gharb County